"BTSTU" is a song by British songwriter and record producer Jai Paul. A demo recording of the song received widespread blog coverage throughout 2010 after having been uploaded to Paul's MySpace page, as well as receiving numerous plays on BBC Radio 1 in the UK. The BBC's Zane Lowe made "BTSTU (Demo)" his Hottest Record in the World. On the strength of this demo, Paul was long-listed for the BBC Sound of 2011 poll.

Release
An edited version of "BTSTU" entitled "BTSTU (Edit)" was officially released on 21 April 2011, via XL Recordings. The song received airplay again on UK national radio by DJs including Gilles Peterson, Annie Mac, Nick Grimshaw, Reggie Yates and Fearne Cotton, with Zane Lowe making it his Hottest Record in the World for a second time. On June 2, 2011, a user with the handle "Jai Paul" on NishaJL Music Blog commented that the name of the track means "Back To Save The Universe".

Critical reception
The single received favourable reviews from The Daily Telegraph and American blog 'The Wounded Jukebox'. Ryan Dombal of Pitchfork compared the single to "the unmistakable lope of one J Dilla".

"BTSTU" was included in the end-of-year lists in 2011 by Pitchfork, The Fader, and Pigeons and Planes. The Washington Post mentioned "BTSTU" in their 'Singles File: Best of 2011', describing it as "a precursor to the entire career of James Blake".

Legacy
The song has been influential on underground as well as mainstream pop music in the 2010s. The song had struck a chord internationally. The Canadian rapper Drake leaked a track titled "Dreams Money Can Buy" which sampled "BTSTU (Demo)" in May 2011. In July 2011 the song was sampled again for Travis Garland and JoJo's duet "Paint", and New York singer-songwriter Niia uploaded a cover version of "BTSTU" to her SoundCloud page. The 2012 song "End of Time" by Beyoncé also sampled the song.

It was also sampled by Charli XCX in Dreams Money Can Buy in 2012.

Track listing

Personnel
 Jai Paul – vocals, electric guitar, drums, synthesisers, programming, SFX, engineering, mixing, sound design 
 Anup Paul – additional vocals, sound design, mastering 
 Sam Pickering – saxophone
 Dave Cooley – mastering

Charts

Release history

References

2011 singles
Jai Paul songs
2011 songs
Song recordings produced by A. K. Paul